The North Korean cult of personality surrounding its ruling family, the Kim family, has existed in North Korea for decades and can be found in many examples of North Korean culture. Although not acknowledged by the North Korean government, many defectors and Western visitors state there are often stiff penalties for those who criticize or do not show "proper" respect for Kim Il-sung and Kim Jong-il, officially referred to as "eternal leaders of Korea". The personality cult began soon after Kim Il-sung took power in 1948, and was greatly expanded after his death in 1994.

While other countries have had cults of personality to various degrees, the pervasiveness and extreme nature of North Korea's personality cult surpasses that of even Joseph Stalin or Mao Zedong. The cult is also marked by the intensity of the people's feelings for and devotion to their leaders, and the key role played by a Confucianized ideology of familism both in maintaining the cult and thereby in sustaining the regime itself. The North Korean cult of personality is a large part of Juche, the official ideology of the country.

Background

According to Dae-Sook Suh, the cult of personality surrounding the Kim family requires total loyalty and subjugation to the Kim family and establishes the country as a one-man dictatorship through successive generations. The 1972 constitution of North Korea incorporates the ideas of Kim Il-sung as the only guiding principle of the state and his activities as the only cultural heritage of the people. According to New Focus International, the cult of personality, particularly surrounding Kim Il-sung, has been crucial for legitimizing the family's hereditary succession, and Park Yong-soo said in the Australian Journal of International Affairs that the "prestige of the Suryong  has
been given the highest priority over everything else in North Korea".

Kim Il-sung developed the political ideology of the Juche idea, generally understood as self-reliance, and further developed it between the 1950s and the 1970s. Juche became the main guide of all forms of thought, education, culture and life throughout the nation until Kim Jong-il introduced the Songun (military-first) policy in 1995, which augments the Juche philosophy and has a great impact on national economic policies.

At the 4th Party Conference held in April 2012, Kim Jong-un further defined Juche as the comprehensive thought of Kim Il-sung, developed and deepened by Kim Jong-il, therefore terming it as "Kimilsungism-Kimjongilism" and that it was "the only guiding idea of the party" and nation.

According to a 2013 report by New Focus International, the two major North Korean news publications (Rodong Sinmun and the Korean Central News Agency) publish around 300 articles per month relating to the "cult of Kim". The report further suggests that with the death of Kim Jong-il, the average North Korean citizen is growing weary of the vast amount of propaganda surrounding the Kims. Daily NK likewise published in 2015 that the younger generation is more interested in the outside world and that the government is finding it difficult to secure the loyalty of the "jangmadang" (marketplace) generation and promoting the idolization of Kim Jong-un.

The North Korean government claims there is no cult of personality, but rather genuine support not only for their nation's leadership but also the philosophy of Juche socialism.

Kim Il-sung

The personality cult surrounding Kim Il-sung is by far the most widespread
among the people. While there is genuine affection for Kim Il-sung, it has been manipulated by the government for political purposes.

The personality cult had its beginnings as early as 1949, with the appearance of the first statues of Kim Il-sung. The veneration of Kim Il-sung came into full effect following a mass purge in 1953. In 1967, Kim Jong-il was appointed to the state propaganda and information department, where he began to focus his energy on developing the veneration of his father. It was around this time that the title Suryong ('Great Leader') came into habitual usage. However, Kim Il-sung had begun calling himself "Great Leader" as early as 1949.

Hwang Jang-yop, the second highest level North Korean defector, has said that the country is completely ruled by the sole ideology of the "Great Leader". He further said that during the de-Stalinization period in the USSR, when Stalin's cult of personality was dismantled in 1956, some North Korean students studying in the Soviet Union also began to criticize Kim Il-sung's growing personality cult and when they returned home they "were subject to intensive interrogation that lasted for months" and "Those found the least bit suspicious were killed in secret".

According to official biographies, Kim Il-sung came from a long lineage of leaders and official North Korean modern history focuses on his life and activities. He is credited with almost single-handedly defeating the Japanese at the end of the occupation of Korea (ignoring Soviet and American efforts) and with rebuilding the nation after the Korean War. Over the course of his life he was granted titles of esteem such as "Sun", "Great Chairman", "Heavenly Leader" and many others, as well as awards like the "Double Hero Gold Medal". These titles and awards were often self-given and the practice would be repeated by his son. The Korean Central News Agency (the official government news agency) continually reported on the titles and perceived affection granted to Kim Il-sung by world leaders including Mao Zedong of China, Fidel Castro of Cuba and Jimmy Carter of the United States.

All major publications (newspapers, textbooks etc.) were to include "words of instruction" from Kim Il-sung.
Additionally, his name must be written as a single word in one line, it may not be split into two parts if there is a page break or the line of text runs out of room (for example: Kim Il-sung, not Kim Il-...sung).

North Korean children were taught in school that they were fed, clothed and nurtured in all aspects by the "grace of the Chairman". The larger elementary schools in the country have a room set aside for lectures that deal specifically with Kim Il-sung (known as the Kim Il-sung Research Institute). These rooms are well taken care of, are built of high quality materials, and have a model of his birthplace in Mangyongdae. The size of the images of him which adorned public buildings are regulated to be in proportion to the size of the building on which they hang. His place of birth has also become a place of pilgrimage.

Kang Chol-hwan wrote of his childhood in North Korea: To my childish eyes and to those of all my friends, Kim Il-sung and Kim Jong-il were perfect beings, untarnished by any base human function. I was convinced, as we all were, that neither of them urinated or defecated. Who could imagine such things of gods? 

In his memoir With the Century, Kim Il-sung tells an anecdote involving his father and grandfather that gives the rationale for this sanitized presentation of North Korean leaders to their followers. The memoir says that as a young pupil, Kim Il-sung's father was often sent to fetch wine for one of his teachers, who drank frequently, until one day his father saw the drunken teacher fall face-first into a ditch. This led to a confrontation in which the young pupil shamed the embarrassed teacher into giving up wine altogether. Kim Il-sung's grandfather draws the moral of this story: My grandfather's opinion was this: If pupils peep into their teacher's private life frequently, they lose their awe of him; the teacher must give his pupils the firm belief that their teacher neither eats nor urinates; only then can he maintain his authority at school; so a teacher should set up a screen and live behind it.

Biographer Dae-Sook Suh notes: The magnitude of adulation often borders on fanaticism. His photograph is displayed ahead of the national flag and national emblem; the song of Marshal Kim Il-sung is played ahead of the national anthem; the best institution of higher learning is named after him; the highest party school is also named after him; and there are songs, poems, essays, stories, and even a flower named after him.

The Kimilsungia is an orchid named after Kim Il-sung by Indonesian former president Sukarno. It was named after him in 1965 during a visit to the Bogor Botanical Gardens. According to a 2005 speech by Kim Jong-il, Sukarno and the garden's director wanted to name the flower after Kim Il-sung. Kim Il-sung declined, yet Sukarno insisted, "No. You have rendered enormous services to mankind, so you deserve a high honour." Domestically, the flowers (and the Kimjongilia, described below) are used in idolizing the leadership.

When Kim Il-sung died in 1994, Kim Jong-il declared a national mourning period for three years. Those who were found violating the mourning rules (such as drinking) were met with punishment. After his death he was referred to as the "Eternal President". In 1998 the national constitution was changed to reflect this. When his father died, Kim Jong-il greatly expanded the nation's cult of personality.

In 1997, the Juche Era dating system, which begins with the birth of Kim Il-sung (April 15, 1912) as year 1, was introduced and replaced the Gregorian calendar. The year  would thus correspond to Juche  (there is no year 0).

July 8, 2014 marked the 20th anniversary of Kim Il-sung's death. North Korean authorities declared a ten-day mourning period which ran from July 1 to July 10. The anniversary involved lectures, study sessions, local choirs, etc., with children and workers being mobilized to take part in the various events. According to a resident of Hyesan, "Nowadays people are having a hard time... as events related to the passing of the Suryeong are going on every single day in the Democratic Women's Union and workplaces alike". Nevertheless, the resident said, "Nobody is complaining about it, maybe because ever since the purge of Jang Song-taek last year, if you picked a fight they'd just drag you away".

Kim Jong-il

These claims, like those surrounding his father, continued throughout his life.

Starting in the early 1970s Kim Il-sung began to contemplate the succession question, albeit surreptitiously at first, but by 1975 Kim Jong-il was referred to as the "party center", or in connection with his father with references to "our great suryong and the party center". In 1977, the first confirmation of Kim Jong-il's succession by name was published in a booklet which designated the younger Kim as the only heir to Kim Il-sung, that he was a loyal servant of his father and had inherited his father's virtues, and that all party members were to pledge their loyalty to Kim Jong-il. They were also urged to support his absolute authority and to obey him unconditionally.

Prior to 1996, Kim Jong-il forbade the erection of statues of himself and discouraged portraits.
However, in 1996, schools were required to build a separate room for lectures dealing specifically with Kim Jong-il known as the Kim Jong-il Research Institute. They include a model of his birthplace. There are approximately 40,000 "research institutes" (total includes both Kim Il-sung and Kim Jong-il's) throughout the country.

Between 1973 and 2012, Jong-il accumulated no fewer than 54 titles, most of which had little or nothing at all to do with real political or military accomplishments since he never had any military training. His most common title was "Dear Leader."

Over the course of his life, the government issued numerous propaganda reports of the great accomplishments achieved by Kim Jong-il, such as that he could walk and talk before the age of six months. The North Korean newspaper, Rodong Sinmun, reported that an "unidentified French fashion expert" said of Kim's fashion, "Kim Jong-il mode, which is now spreading expeditiously worldwide, is something unprecedented in the world's history." The Korean Central News Agency has also reported, among other things, that according to eyewitness accounts "nature and the sky unfolded such mysterious ecstasy in celebration of the birthday of Kim Jong Il."

To commemorate Kim Jong-il's 46th birthday, Japanese botanist Kamo Mototeru cultivated a new perennial begonia named "Kimjongilia" (literally, "flower of Kim Jong-il").

After Kim Jong-il's death

After his death on December 17, 2011, the Korean Central News Agency (KCNA) said that layers of ice ruptured with an unprecedentedly loud crack at Chon Lake on Mount Paektu and a snowstorm with strong winds hit the area.
A political paper by his son, Kim Jong-un, sought to solidify his father as the "Eternal General Secretary of our Party." Many had been seen weeping during the 100-day mourning period, which is typical of Korean Confucian society, and an analyst at South Korea's Korea Institute for National Unification determined that much of the public grief evidenced during the mourning period was a genuine expression of sorrow. Yet, a journalist from the West questioned the sincerity of the displays of grief.

Similar to the mourning period of Kim Il-sung, individuals who did not follow the 100-day mourning period regulations or were thought to be insincere in their grief were subject to punishment and in some cases may have been executed. A notable example of this was the alleged death of Kim Chol and other high-ranking officials. However, in the case of Chol, doubts have been raised as to the credibility of the original account with Foreign Policy stating that stories about violent deaths of North Korean elites tend to be "exaggerated" and observing the version of events disseminated by South Korean media was likely based on "gossip".

Several large-scale bronze statues have been erected alongside statues of Kim Il-sung. The government has also been replacing statues of Kim Il-sung with updated versions along with new statues of Kim Jong-il beside the ones of his father in each of the provincial capitals and other sites.

Following his death, numerous commemorative stamps and coins were made and slogans have been carved on the sides of mountains in honor of his 70th birthday anniversary.

Kim Jong-un

Kim Jong-un, the grandson of North Korea's founder, was largely absent from the public and government service until the mid-2000s. In 2010 he began being referred to as the "Young General" and by late 2011 as "Respected General". Like his father, he lacks any formal military training or service. With the death of his father, state media began to refer to him as the "Great Successor." He is also called "Dear Respected" or "Supreme Leader." When he was still a new ruler, the development of his own personality cult was well underway, with large numbers of posters, signs, and other propaganda being placed all over the country. A journalist from Japan's The Asahi Shimbun said that his striking likeness in appearance to Kim Il-sung has helped solidify him as the undisputed ruler in the minds of the people.

Kim Jong-un marks the third generation of Kim family dynastic leadership. According to Daily NK, people who criticized the succession were sent to re-education camps or otherwise punished and, after the mourning period of Kim Jong-il, government authorities began to increase their efforts on building the idolization of Kim Jong-un.

After Kim Jong-il's death the president of the Presidium announced that "Respected Comrade Kim Jong-un is our party, military and country's supreme leader who inherits great comrade Kim Jong-il's ideology, leadership, character, virtues, grit and courage."

Shortly after the new leader came to power, a -long propaganda sign was erected in his honor near a lake in Ryanggang Province. The sign, supposedly visible from space, reads "Long Live General Kim Jong-un, the Shining Sun!"

In 2013, the Workers' Party of Korea amended the Ten Principles for the Establishment of a Monolithic Ideological System, which in practice serves as the primary legal authority and framework of the country, to demand "absolute obedience" to Kim Jong-un.

Kim Jong-un's uncle, Jang Sung-taek, was executed on December 12, 2013. His death was attributed, in part, to undermining the Kim family personality cult. His death has also been seen as a move by Kim Jong-un to consolidate his own cult.

In 2015, at the end of the formal three-year mourning period for the death of Kim Jong-il, Kim Jong-un ordered the construction of new monuments to be built in every county of North Korea. Extensive renovations to the Kumsusan Memorial Palace have also been ordered. According to The Daily Telegraph, analysts "say the order to erect more statues to the Kim family will be a heavy financial burden on an economy that is already struggling due to years of chronic mismanagement and international sanctions".

The first monument to be at least partially dedicated to Kim Jong-un was announced in January 2017. It is to be constructed on Mt. Paektu and also includes monuments dedicated to Kim Il-sung and Kim Jong-il. Additionally, stand alone "mosaic murals" of Kim Jong-un are being planned for major cities in each province.

Others
The personality cult extends to other members of the Kim family, although to a lesser degree.

Kim Ung-u
According to the official North Korean history, Kim Il-sung's paternal great-grandfather, fought against the American schooner USS General Sherman in the 1866 incident and was also an anti-Japanese activist; North Korea won the battle and captured the ship which is now on display in a museum. However, these claims remain unsubstantiated and many historians outside of North Korea doubt their legitimacy.

Kang Pan-sok
Kang Pan-sok, the mother of Kim Il-sung, was the first member of the Kim family to have a cult of personality of her own to supplement that of her son's, from the late 1960s onwards. In addition to a museum and statue in Chilgol, her birthplace, she has been given the title "Mother of Korea" and has had songs and articles written in praise of her.

Kim Hyong-jik
Kim Hyong-jik, the father of Kim Il-sung, is venerated by official North Korean historiographies for having been a prominent leader of the anti-colonial Korean independence movement. In fact, official sources claim that Kim not only led the March 1st Uprising of 1919, but also that it took place in Pyongyang—both blatant fabrications. While in reality Kim was at one point briefly detained for anti-Japanese activities, most outside scholars do not support claims of anything further. In fact, according to biographer Dae-Sook Suh, efforts to describe Kim Hyong-jik as playing a major role in the anti-Japanese struggle "seem to be directed more toward upgrading the attributes of Kim [Il-sung] as a pious son." This attribution became important as Kim Il-sung used these stories to aid his ascent to power.

Kim Hyong-jik currently has a museum and statue dedicated to him in his hometown of Ponghwa.

Kim Hyong-gwon
Kim Hyong-gwon, paternal uncle of Kim Il-sung and brother of Kim Hyong-jik, is honored in North Korea as an anti-Japanese activist because he skirmished with local police, for which he was arrested and later died on January 12, 1936, during internment in Seoul. There is a statue in his honor in Hongwon, the site of the skirmish. Kim Il-sung later renamed a county in southeastern Ryanggang Province after his uncle. It is called "Kimhyonggwon County".

Kim Jong-suk

Kim Jong-suk, mother of Kim Jong-il, is described as "a revolutionary immortal" and "an anti-Japanese war hero [who] upheld the original idea and policy of Kim Il Sung and performed distinguished feats in the development of the movement for the women's emancipation in Korea." She is typified as a model revolutionary, wife, and maternal figure, and North Korean society looks to stories of her as examples of how to live life.

Although she was first lady of the Democratic People's Republic of Korea in the first year of its founding in 1948, she died in 1949, and starting in 1974, in conjunction with her son Kim Jong-il's rise to position as the heir apparent, she was increasingly praised and her accomplishments memorialized throughout the nation. A museum and statue was built in her home town in her honor and she was called an "indomitable Communist revolutionary" by Kim Sung-ae who was Kim Il-sung's then present wife, despite being largely ignored until this point. Thus, originally she was honored as a guerrilla, but not necessarily as a mother or wife. In the 1990s, Kim Jong-suk's portrait was even added to those of Kim Il-sung and Kim Jong-il, which were displayed in every household and building and treated as sacred objects of veneration and worship. Furthermore, when referring to the "three Great Generals of Paekdu Mountain," a sacred dormant volcano on North Korea's northern border with China, North Koreans understand this to mean Kim Il-sung, Kim Jong-suk, and their son Kim Jong-il.

There is a wax replica of her in the International Friendship Exhibition.

Ko Yong-hui 

Ko Yong-hui, the third wife of Kim Jong-il and mother of Kim Jong-un, had three attempts made to idolize her in a style similar to that associated with other female members of the family. These attempts either failed or were ceased after 2012. In 2010, an internal propaganda film was produced about her and her activities with Kim Jong-il during his leadership. It also touched on her important role in raising her son. She is mentioned in North Korean biographies about Kim Jong-un and in some North Korean monuments and texts. She is referred to as "Mother of Great Songun Korea" or "Great Mother", with her name not being public knowledge.

The building of a cult of personality around Ko encounters the problem of her bad songbun (social class status), as her Korean-Japanese heritage would make her part of the lowest "hostile" class, a possible issue for the pure Kim family mythology.

In 2012, Kim Jong-un built a grave for Ko on Mount Taesong.

Familism in the personality cult
Familism is a type of collectivism in which the one is expected to prioritize the needs of the greater society or family over the needs of the individual. This plays out on a large scale in North Korea, where the Great Leader Kim Il-sung is Father and the Worker's Party is Mother. Thus, not only are the people expected to cherish their birth parents and treat them with all the respect demanded of traditional Confucian filial piety, but they must cherish and adore the ruling Kim family and the Mother Party even more so.

Familism in North Korea stems from a combination of the traditional East Asian Confucian value of filial piety, the communist system of collectivism, and the Kim cult of personality. As a traditional East Asian and Confucian value, the importance of family has come to resonate through all aspects of North Korean life, from politics to the economy to education and even to interpersonal relationships between friends and enemies.

When the Soviet Union first entered North Korea in 1945 to start its occupation, it had to start almost from scratch in establishing a communist base in the capital region of Pyongyang. In fact, the Soviets' ideologies of communism and socialism were likely as foreign to the Koreans of Pyongyang as the Soviets themselves. However, by emphasizing family and a father-child relationship between the Soviet Union and Korea, and later between Kim Il-sung and the North Korean people, Kim not only managed to apply Western Marxism to an Asian state, but also to secure his own personality cult, thereby constructing a sense of unquestioning loyalty toward him amongst the North Korean people when North Korea was at its most vulnerable to unwelcome western influences.

However, in the late 1960s after the establishment of Juche as official North Korean ideology, through the cult of personality North Korea began to prominently focus the family ideology more on the North Korean nation itself, with Kim Il-sung himself as the new pater familias.

The cults of personality also promote the idea of the ruling Kims as a model family. In grief over the death of his second son, Kim Man-il in 1947, Kim Il-sung returned to the very same spot a decade later with a Korean shaman to perform rituals to "assuage his loss and pain." There was particular stress on the Confucian filial love of the son for his parents. After their deaths Kim dedicated monuments to his father and mother, respectively.

However, biographer Dae-Sook Suh doubts the sincerity of Kim's displays of reverence of his parents. In considering Kim's relatively independent childhood, Suh does not believe that Kim held any special love for his parents that would necessitate separate museums and statues for each. Instead, Suh says that "his purpose, rather, seems to be more self-serving: an effort to build his own image as a pious Korean son from a revolutionary family." By publicly portraying himself as a loyal son who loved his mother and father, Kim positioned himself to demand the same filial loyalty from his subjects.

Likewise, in celebration of his father's 60th birthday, Kim Jong-il produced three operas for him, built three monuments, including North Korea's Arch of Triumph, for his 70th birthday in 1982, and upon Kim Il-sung's death in 1994, Kim Jong-il declared three years of mourning before fully claiming leadership of North Korea.

Monuments, images and cost

By 1992, according to Victor Cha, there had been nearly 40,000 statues of Kim Il-sung erected throughout the country, and with his death in 1994 the government began erecting 3,200 obelisks, called "", in every town and city. These obelisks espouse the virtues of the "Great Marshal" and, like the other monuments, citizens (and tourists) are required to present flowers and other tokens of respect to the statues during certain holidays and when they visit them. A 2018 review of satellite imagery revealed the existence of fewer than 11,200 outside monuments and murals.

There are legal requirements associated with photographing statues of the Kims including one that states visitors must photograph the entire statue, not just the head or any other individual part.

After the death of Kim Jong-il the government began to inscribe his name on each of the obelisks and build new statues in his image.

Images of Kim Il-sung and Kim Jong-il are prominent in places associated with public transportation, hanging at every North Korean train station and airport. Every North Korean household is required to have a picture of both Kims hanging on a wall. Nothing else may hang on that wall and they are given special cloths to clean the images daily. Party members in neighborhoods are assigned to inspect houses for dusty portraits. If dust is found, a fine has to be paid, its amount depending on the thickness of the layer. The portraits have to be hung high up, so that people in the room may not stand higher than them. Party cadres and military officials must keep three portraits, that of the two deceased leaders and one of Kim Il-sung's wife, Kim Jong-suk. The images are only allowed to be made by government approved artists at specific Mansudae workshops. Images found within newspapers or other publications are to be respected and one must not throw away, deface or otherwise misuse a page that contains an image. They are to be collected and returned. Adult North Koreans are also required to wear a lapel pin that features their image on the left side, above their heart.

There have been sporadic stories of people risking their lives to save the portraits from various disasters but few accounts have been verified. In 2012, a 14-year-old girl drowned while trying to save the images from her family's home during a flash flood. The North Korean government posthumously bestowed upon her the "Kim Jong-il Youth Honor Award" and her school was renamed after her.

The Kumsusan Palace of the Sun was built as the official residence of Kim Il-sung in 1976. After his death it was converted into his mausoleum (and then that of his son's). It is reported to have cost between $100–900 million. Kumsusan is the largest mausoleum dedicated to a communist leader.

The overall estimated cost of maintaining the personality cult varies greatly between published sources. A white paper by the Korea Institute for International Economic Policy placed the cost at 38.5% of North Korea's budget in 2004, up from 19% in 1990. However, other sources such as South Korea's Chosun Ilbo and the United Kingdom's Daily Telegraph estimate the cost in 2012 at between $40 million and $100 million respectively. Large scale construction projects for the Kim family has been blamed for the country's economic downturn in the 1980s.

Holidays

In 2013, a new holiday was announced to be celebrated on February 14, which commemorates the date that Kim Jong-il assumed the title "Generalissimo of the Democratic People's Republic of Korea". Unlike celebrations surrounding other important figures throughout the world, the celebrations are mandatory, with numerous events planned (such as dances, sporting events and parades), and citizens will place gifts of flowers at the foot of monuments. Birthday celebrations for the Kims also involve state media broadcasts of films about the lives and accomplishments of the leaders the night before the actual holiday. People are not allowed to talk or fall asleep until the broadcasts are over.

International inspirations

Between 60,000 and 220,000 gifts to Kim Il-sung and Kim Jong-il from foreign leaders, businesspersons and others are housed in the International Friendship Exhibition.
The museum is a source of pride for the North Korean government and is used as evidence of the greatness and popularity of their leaders. The North Korean government places a large emphasis on international recognition in order to legitimize their rule in the minds of the population. Tours are arranged to the Exhibition Hall whereupon entering and leaving visitors must pay homage by bowing before images of Kim Il-sung and Kim Jong-il, as per Korean manners and tradition.

The former dictator of the Socialist Republic of Romania, Nicolae Ceaușescu, partially modeled his own cult of personality on Kim Il-sung's personality cult. When he visited North Korea in 1971, he was impressed by the highly personal way in which Kim ruled North Korea, and launched the July Theses when he returned to Bucharest.

Historical significance
Over the past half-century, the North Korean system has promoted an image of not only Kim Il-sung, but also his family, as a nationalist cult. (see Other) Thus, Kim Il-sung staked his claim as uniquely deserving and qualified to the exclusion of all other potential claimants to leadership by promoting the myth of an impressive family lineage. Kim Il-sung was not only descended and born of revolutionary leaders, but he married a revolutionary leader (Kim Jong-suk) and fathered a revolutionary leader (Kim Jong-il). This in turn would help justify the succession of Kim Jong-il and then Kim Jong-un in replacing their fathers. The idea is that as long as his bloodline continues to rule, Kim Il-sung's righteous and godlike spirit lives on in the North Korean leadership.

See also

 Media coverage of North Korea 
 Juche
 Imperial cult
 Charismatic authority
 Propaganda in North Korea
 Paektu Mountain
 The Great General can use teleportation
 Death and funeral of Kim Il-sung
 Death and funeral of Kim Jong-il
 Stalin's cult of personality
 Song of General Kim Il-sung
 Mao Zedong's cult of personality
 Xi Jinping's cult of personality
 Nicolae Ceaușescu's cult of personality
 List of cults of personality

References

Bibliography

External links
 NK News: How the Kim Cult of Personality Came to Dominate North Korean Life
 Historical perspective on the cult of personality

Cults of personality
Ideology of the Workers' Party of Korea
Society of North Korea
North Korean politicians
Kim Jong-il
Kim Jong-un
Kim dynasty (North Korea)
Kim Il-sung
Cult of personality